Kaitlyn Rochelle Dever (born December 21, 1996) is an American actress. She gained recognition for her roles in the FX crime drama television series Justified (2011–2015), the ABC/Fox sitcom Last Man Standing (2011–2021), the Netflix drama miniseries Unbelievable (2019), and the Hulu drama Dopesick (2021). She earned Golden Globe Award nominations for Unbelievable and Dopesick as well as a Primetime Emmy Award nomination for Dopesick.

Dever has also played supporting roles in the films Bad Teacher (2011), The Spectacular Now (2013), Short Term 12 (2013), Detroit (2017), Beautiful Boy (2018), Dear Evan Hansen (2021), and Ticket to Paradise (2022). She had leading roles in Them That Follow (2019), Booksmart (2019), and Rosaline (2022).

Early life 
Dever was born in Phoenix, Arizona, to Tim and Kathy Dever. She has two younger sisters, Mady and Jane Dever. At the age of five, she developed an interest in the performing arts with her parents sending her to an acting school. She also participated in gymnastics, ballet and ice skating, until she focused on acting. Her family then moved to Dallas when her father was given the role of the voice of Barney the Purple Dinosaur, and where she enrolled at the Dallas Young Actors Studio in a month-long acting program. Honing her acting skills at the studio, she booked a number of commercials, before moving to Los Angeles.

Career

2009–2012: Career beginnings and work on TV 

Dever's first notable acting role was as Gwen Thompson in the 2009 film An American Girl: Chrissa Stands Strong. In 2011, she garnered an early breakout role as Loretta McCready in the FX series Justified. In the same year, she was cast as a series regular in the ABC (and later Fox) sitcom Last Man Standing, starring with Tim Allen as her father. Starting with the seventh season of the series, Dever began appearing in a recurring role to focus on other film and television projects.

Dever's other television credits include Make It or Break It, Modern Family, Private Practice, Party Down, The Mentalist, and Curb Your Enthusiasm. Her 2011 film credits include Cinema Verite, Bad Teacher, and the Clint Eastwood–directed film J. Edgar. In 2012, Dever was nominated three times at the 33rd Young Artist Awards: for her supporting roles in Bad Teacher and Last Man Standing, and for her recurring role in Justified.

2013–2019: Independent film 
In 2013, she appeared in supporting roles in the critically acclaimed films The Spectacular Now and Short Term 12, opposite Brie Larson. Her role in the latter garnered widespread acclaim from critics.

Dever appeared in the 2014 dark comedy film Laggies, directed by Lynn Shelton, alongside Chloë Grace Moretz and Keira Knightley. In the same year, she co-starred in the film Men, Women & Children, directed by Jason Reitman. In 2017 she reunited with Shelton for her drama film Outside In, as a supporting cast member. 2017 also saw the release of the films We Don't Belong Here, All Summers End and Detroit, where Dever appeared in supporting roles as well.

In 2018, she performed in minor roles for the political drama The Front Runner and the biographical drama Beautiful Boy, the latter alongside Timothée Chalamet. In early 2019, Dever appeared in the drama-thriller film Them That Follow directed by Britt Poulton and Dan Madison Savage. The film had its world premiere at the Sundance Film Festival on January 27, 2019, and was released on August 2, 2019, by 1091 Media.

2019–present: leading roles and breakthrough 

In mid 2019, Dever starred in the critically acclaimed teen comedy Booksmart directed by Olivia Wilde, opposite Beanie Feldstein. The film had its world premiere at South by Southwest on March 11, 2019, and was released on May 24, 2019, by Annapurna Pictures. She also starred in Unbelievable, a Netflix miniseries which premiered in September 2019. Dever's performance was praised by critics, receiving a Golden Globe nomination for Best Actress – Miniseries or Television Film. She also received nominations for the Critics' Choice Television Award for Best Actress in a Movie/Miniseries, the BAFTA Rising Star Award, and the TCA Award for Individual Achievement in Drama.

In 2020, Dever appeared in the Quibi comedy series Home Movie: The Princess Bride, directed by Jason Reitman, to raise money for World Central Kitchen. Later that year, she co-starred in the Audible audio drama When You Finish Saving the World, written and directed by Jesse Eisenberg. The story is told from the perspective of three family members, at different stages of their lives. Dever voices Rachel, an 18 year old woman recording tapes for her boyfriend stationed in Afghanistan.

In 2020, she starred in the television special Coastal Elites, directed by Jay Roach for HBO. On August 17, 2020, she was cast as Zoe Murphy in Stephen Chbosky's film adaptation of Broadway musical Dear Evan Hansen.

Dever and her sister Mady make up the musical duo group Beulahbelle. In February 2020, they released their first single, "Raleigh".

Dever appeared in an episode of the anthology series Monsterland for Hulu. In 2021, she starred as Abbi Miller in episode 3 of B.J. Novak's FX anthology series The Premise. Dever has also starred in the title role of the film Rosaline.  She also played Betsy Mallum in the 2021 Hulu miniseries Dopesick, for which she received a Primetime Emmy Award nomination.

Filmography

Film

Television

Video games

Music videos

Audiobooks

Awards and nominations

References

External links 
 
 
 

1996 births
21st-century American actresses
Actresses from Dallas
Actresses from Los Angeles
Actresses from Phoenix, Arizona
American child actresses
American film actresses
American television actresses
American video game actresses
Living people